Times-Herald or Times Herald may refer to the following newspapers:

The Times Herald, based in Port Huron, Michigan
The Times Herald (Norristown, Pennsylvania)
Times Herald-Record, based in Middletown, New York
Dallas Times Herald, based in Dallas, Texas, now defunct
Newnan Times-Herald, based in Newnan, Georgia
Olean Times Herald, based in Olean, New York
Vallejo Times Herald, based in Vallejo, California
Washington Times-Herald, based in Washington, D.C., now defunct
Washington Times-Herald (Indiana), based in Washington, Indiana